Popovača is a town in Croatia in the Moslavina geographical region. Administratively it is part of the Sisak-Moslavina County.

History
In the late 19th and early 20th century, Popovača was part of the Bjelovar-Križevci County of the Kingdom of Croatia-Slavonia.

Population

The total municipality population is 11,905 (2011 census), in the following settlements:

 Ciglenica, population 134
 Donja Gračenica, population 805
 Donja Jelenska, population 78
 Donja Vlahinička, population 551
 Gornja Gračenica, population 954
 Gornja Jelenska, population 757
 Moslavačka Slatina, population 72
 Osekovo, population 853
 Podbrđe, population 180
 Popovača, population 4,207
 Potok, population 756
 Stružec, population 687
 Voloder, population 1,871

96% of the population are ethnic Croats.

References

External links
 

Cities and towns in Croatia
Populated places in Sisak-Moslavina County